Nancy Lopes Garcia is Professor of Statistics at University of Campinas in Brazil. Her research interests include modeling of and inference for spatial point processes, chains of infinite or variable memory, and inference for functional data.

Garcia got her PhD at the University of Wisconsin at  Madison, working with Thomas G. Kurtz. She is an Elected Member of the International Statistical Institute and has published some 50 papers in scientific journals, supervised 6 PhD students and 5 postdocs.

References

External links
Home page

Academic staff of the State University of Campinas
Brazilian statisticians
Women statisticians
Elected Members of the International Statistical Institute
Living people
Year of birth missing (living people)